Infinite Jest is a 1996 novel by American writer David Foster Wallace. Categorized as an encyclopedic novel, Infinite Jest is featured in TIME magazine's list of the 100 best English-language novels published between 1923 and 2005.

The novel has an unconventional narrative structure and includes hundreds of extensive endnotes, some with footnotes of their own.

A literary fiction bestseller after having sold 44,000 hardcover copies in its first year of publication, the novel has since sold more than a million copies worldwide.

Development
Wallace began Infinite Jest, "or something like it", at various times between 1986 and 1989. His efforts in 1991–92 were more productive. 

From early 1992 until the novel's publication, excerpts from various drafts appeared sporadically in magazines and literary journals including Harvard Review, Grand Street, Conjunctions, Review of Contemporary Fiction, Harper's Magazine, The Iowa Review, The New Yorker and the Los Angeles Times Magazine. 

The book was edited by publisher Little, Brown and Company's Michael Pietsch. Pietsch made suggestions and recommendations to Wallace, but every editing decision was Wallace's. He accepted cuts amounting to around 250 manuscript pages from his original submission. He resisted many changes for reasons that he usually explained.

The novel gets its name from Hamlet, Act V, Scene 1, in which Hamlet holds the skull of the court jester, Yorick, and says, "Alas, poor Yorick! I knew him, Horatio: a fellow of infinite jest, of most excellent fancy: he hath borne me on his back a thousand times; and now, how abhorred in my imagination it is!" 

Wallace's working title for Infinite Jest was A Failed Entertainment.

Setting
In the novel's future world, the United States, Canada, and Mexico together compose a unified North American superstate known as the Organization of North American Nations, or O.N.A.N. (an allusion to onanism).

Corporations are allowed the opportunity to bid for and purchase naming rights for each calendar year, replacing traditional numerical designations with ostensibly honorary monikers bearing corporate names. Although the narrative is fragmented and spans several "named" years, most of the story takes place during "The Year of the Depend Adult Undergarment" (Y.D.A.U.).

On the orders of US President Johnny Gentle (a "clean freak" who campaigned on the platform of cleaning up the US while ensuring that no American would be caused any discomfort in the process), much of what used to be the northeastern United States and southeastern Canada has become a giant hazardous waste dump, an area "given" to Canada and known as the "Great Concavity" by Americans due to the resulting displacement of the border.

Plot
There are several major interwoven narratives, including:
 A fringe group of Québécois radicals, Les Assassins des Fauteuils Rollents (English: The Wheelchair Assassins; A.F.R.), plans a violent geopolitical coup, and is opposed by high-level US operatives.
 Various residents of the Boston area reach "rock bottom" with their substance abuse problems, and enter a residential drug and alcohol recovery program (Ennet House Drug and Alcohol Recovery House) where they progress in recovery through Alcoholics Anonymous (AA) and Narcotics Anonymous (NA).
 Students train and study at the Enfield Tennis Academy (E.T.A.) run by James and Avril Incandenza and Avril's adopted brother Charles Tavis.
 The history of the Incandenza family unfolds, focusing on the youngest son, Hal.

These narratives are connected via a film, Infinite Jest, also called "the Entertainment" or "the samizdat". The film is so entertaining that its viewers lose all interest in anything other than repeatedly viewing it, and thus eventually die. It was James Incandenza's final work. He completed it during a period of sobriety that was insisted upon by its lead actress, Joelle van Dyne. The Québécois separatists seek a replicable master copy of the work to aid in acts of terrorism against the United States. The United States Office of Unspecified Services (O.U.S.) aims to intercept the master copy to prevent mass dissemination and the destabilization of the Organization of North American Nations, or else to find or produce an anti-entertainment that can counter the film's effects. Joelle seeks treatment for substance abuse problems at Ennet House. A.F.R. member (and possible O.U.S. double agent) Rémy Marathe visits Ennet House, aiming to find Joelle and a lead to the master copy of "the Entertainment".

Major characters

The Incandenza family
 Hal Incandenza is the youngest of the Incandenza children and arguably the novel's protagonist, as its events revolve around his time at E.T.A. Hal is prodigiously intelligent and talented, but insecure about his abilities (and eventually his mental state). His friend Michael Pemulis calls him Inc, and his favorite thing to do is secretly smoke marijuana in the seclusion of the E.T.A. tunnels. He has difficult relationships with both his parents. He has an eidetic memory and has memorized the Oxford English Dictionary, and like his mother often corrects his friends' and family's grammar. Hal's mental degradation and alienation from those around him culminate in his chronologically last appearance in the novel, in which his attempts at speech and facial expressions are incomprehensible to others. The origin of Hal's final condition is unclear; possible causes include marijuana withdrawal, a drug obtained by Michael Pemulis, a patch of mold Hal ate as a child, and a mental breakdown from years of training to be a top junior tennis player.
 Avril Incandenza, née Mondragon, is the domineering mother of the Incandenza children and wife of James. A tall (197 cm, or 6 ft. 5.5 in.), beautiful francophone Quebecer, she becomes a major figure at Enfield Tennis Academy after her husband's suicide and begins, or perhaps continues, a relationship with Charles Tavis, the school's new head, also a Canadian and Avril's either adoptive or half-brother. Her sexual relationships with men are a matter of some speculation/discussion; one with John "No Relation" Wayne is depicted. Avril has phobias about uncleanliness and disease, closed doors, and overhead lighting, and is also described as agoraphobic. She has an obsessive-compulsive need to watch over E.T.A. and her two youngest sons, Hal and Mario, who live at the school; Avril and Orin are no longer in contact. James Incandenza believes that he can connect with his children only through her. Orin believes she runs the family with ingrained manipulation and the illusion of choice. Her family nickname is "the Moms".
 James Orin Incandenza Jr., Avril's husband and Orin's, Mario's and Hal's father, is an optics expert and filmmaker as well as the founder of Enfield Tennis Academy (though he increasingly leaves E.T.A. business to Charles Tavis). The son of small-time actor James O. Incandenza Sr. (who played "The Man from Glad" in the 1960s), James Jr. created Infinite Jest (also known as "the Entertainment" or "the samizdat"), an enigmatic and fatally seductive film that was his last work. He used Joelle van Dyne, his son Orin's strikingly beautiful girlfriend, in many of his films, including the fatal "Entertainment". He appears in the book mainly either in flashbacks or as a "wraith", having killed himself at the age of 54 by placing his head in a microwave oven. He is an alcoholic who drinks Wild Turkey whiskey. His family nickname is "Himself". Orin also calls him "the Mad Stork" or (once) "the Sad Stork".
 Mario Incandenza is the Incandenzas' second son, although his biological father may be Charles Tavis. Severely deformed since birth—he is macrocephalic, homodontic, bradykinetic, and stands or walks at a 45-degree angle—as well as mentally "slow", he is nonetheless perennially cheerful and kind. He is also a budding auteur, having served as James's camera and directorial assistant and later inheriting the prodigious studio equipment and film lab his father built on the Academy grounds. Somewhat surprisingly, he is an avid fan of Madame Psychosis's dark radio show, partly because he finds her voice familiar. Hal, though younger, acts like a supportive older brother to Mario, whom Hal calls "Booboo".
 Orin Incandenza is the Incandenzas' eldest son. He is a punter for the Phoenix Cardinals and a serial womanizer, and is estranged from everyone in his family except Hal. It is suggested that Orin lost his attraction to Joelle after she became disfigured when her mother threw acid in her face during a Thanksgiving dinner, but Orin cites Joelle's questionable relationship with his father as the reason for the breakup even though he later admits he knows there was no romance. Orin focuses his subsequent womanizing on young mothers; Hal suggests that this is because he blames his father's death on his mother. Molly Notkin, a friend of Joelle's, says that Orin has numerous "malcathected issues with his mother". Orin's relationship with his father was tense. His father tells Joelle "he simply didn't know how to speak with either of his undamaged sons without their mother's presence and mediation. Orin could not be made to shut up."

The Enfield Tennis Academy

 Michael Pemulis, a working-class teenager from an Allston, Massachusetts family, and Hal's best friend. A prankster and the school's resident drug dealer, Pemulis is also very proficient in mathematics. This, combined with his limited but ultraprecise lobbing, made him the school's first master of Eschaton, a computer-aided turn-based nuclear wargame that requires players to be adept at both game theory and lobbing tennis balls at targets. Although the novel takes place long after Pemulis's Eschaton days (the game is played by 12- to 14-year-olds), Pemulis is still regarded as the game's all-time greatest player, and he remains the final court of appeal for the game. His brother, Matty, is a gay hustler who as a child was sexually abused by their father.
 John "No Relation" Wayne, the top-ranked player at E.T.A. He is frighteningly efficient, controlled, and machine-like on the court. Wayne is almost never directly quoted in the narrative; his statements are either summarized by the narrator or repeated by other characters. His Canadian citizenship has been revoked since he came to E.T.A. His father is a sick asbestos miner in Quebec who hopes John will soon start earning "serious $" in "the Show" (professional tennis) to "take him away from all this". Pemulis discovers Wayne is having a sexual relationship with Avril Incandenza, and it is later revealed that Hal is also aware of the relationship. Wayne may be sympathetic to, or actively supporting, the radical Quebec separatists.
 Ortho "The Darkness" Stice, another of Hal's close friends. His name consists of the Greek root ortho ("straight") and the anglicized suffix -stice ("a space") from the noun interstice, which originally derived from the Latin verb sistere ("to stand"). He endorses only brands that have black-colored products, and is at all times clothed entirely in black, hence his nickname. Late in the book Stice nearly defeats Hal in a three-set tennis match, shortly after which his forehead is frozen to a window and his bed appears either bolted or mysteriously levitated to the ceiling. There are indications that Stice is being visited by the ghost of James Incandenza.

Ennet House Drug and Alcohol Recovery House
 Don Gately, a former thief and Demerol addict, and current counselor in residence at Ennet House. One of the novel's primary characters, Gately is physically enormous and a reluctant but dedicated Alcoholics Anonymous member. He is critically wounded in an altercation with several Canadian men, and much of the later part of the novel involves his inner monologue while he recuperates in a Boston hospital. Gately had a complicated childhood. His stepfather abused his mother. During his middle-school and high-school years, Gately's size made him a formidable football talent. During his period as an addict and burglar, he accidentally kills M. DuPlessis, a leader of one of the many separatist Québécois organizations featured in the novel. Gately is visited by the ghosts of James O. Incandenza and Lyle.
 Joelle van Dyne, also known as "Madame Psychosis" (cf. metempsychosis), a stage name she received from James Incandenza when she starred in his films (and later her on-air name in her radio show "60+/−"). She became acquainted with James through her college relationship with Orin Incandenza, who referred to her as "The Prettiest Girl of All Time", or P.G.O.A.T. She appears in the lethally addictive Entertainment, reaching down toward a wobbly "neonatal" lens as if it were in a bassinet and apologizing profusely, her face blurred beyond recognition. Extremely beautiful as a young woman, Joelle later becomes a member of the Union of the Hideously and Improbably Deformed (U.H.I.D.), and wears a veil to hide her face. According to Molly Notkin, Joelle's face was disfigured by a beaker of acid her mother threw, intending to hit Joelle's father, who had just revealed he was in love with her (Joelle). Joelle says she wears the veil because her superlative attractiveness plagued her throughout her life, causing her to suffer social and romantic isolation until she met Orin. Joelle tries to "eliminate her own map" (that is, suicide) in Notkin's bathroom by massive ingestion of freebase cocaine, which lands her in Ennet House as a resident. Gately and Joelle develop a mutual attraction.

Les Assassins des Fauteuils Rollents

Les Assassins des Fauteuils Rollents (A.F.R.), the Wheelchair Assassins, are a Québécois separatist group. (The use of "rollents" where "roulants" would be correct is in keeping with other erroneous French words and phrases in the novel.) They are one of many such groups that developed after the United States coerced Canada and Mexico into joining the Organization of North American Nations (O.N.A.N.), but the A.F.R. is the most deadly and extremist. While other separatist groups are willing to settle for nationhood, the A.F.R. wants Canada to secede from O.N.A.N. and to reject America's forced gift of its polluted "Great Concavity" (or, Hal and Orin speculate, is pretending that those are its goals to put pressure on Canada to let Quebec secede). The A.F.R. seeks the master copy of Infinite Jest as a terrorist weapon to achieve its goals. The A.F.R. has its roots in a childhood game in which miners' sons would line up alongside a train track and compete to be the last to jump across the path of an oncoming train, a game in which many were killed or rendered legless (hence the wheelchairs).

Only one miner's son ever (disgracefully) failed to jump—Bernard Wayne, who may be related to E.T.A.'s John Wayne. Québécoise Avril's liaisons with John Wayne, and with A.F.R.'s Guillaume DuPlessis and Luria Perec, suggest that Avril may have ties to the A.F.R. as well. There is also evidence linking E.T.A. prorector Thierry Poutrincourt to the group.
 Rémy Marathe is a member of the Wheelchair Assassins who secretly talks to Hugh/Helen Steeply. Marathe is a quadruple agent: the A.F.R. thinks that he is a triple agent, only pretending to betray the A.F.R., while Marathe and Steeply know that he only pretends to pretend to betray them. He does this in order to secure medical support for his wife (who was born without a skull) from the Office of Unspecified Services. Late in the novel, Marathe is sent to infiltrate Ennet House in the guise of a Swiss drug addict.

Other recurring characters

These characters cross between the major narrative threads:
 Hugh Steeply, an agent who assumes a female identity ("Helen") for an operative role, with whom Orin Incandenza becomes obsessed. Hugh works for the government Office of Unspecified Services and has gone undercover to get information out of Orin about the Entertainment. He is the U.S.O.U.S.'s contact with the A.F.R. mole Marathe.
 Lyle, E.T.A. weight room guru. He spends most of his time perched atop the towel dispenser in the lotus position. Lyle licks the sweat off the boys' bodies after they work out and in turn gives them life advice. His behavior is described by the narrator as unusual but "nothing faggy". Lyle is close to Mario, whom he sometimes employs to speak to players who struggle with self-esteem.
 "Poor Tony" Krause, a cross-dressing junkie and thief who steals a woman's exterior heart, causing her death, and later robs Ennet House residents.
 Randy Lenz, a "small time organic-coke dealer who wears sportcoats rolled up over his parlor-tanned forearms and is always checking his pulse on the inside of his wrists". An Ennet House resident, he constantly asks the time but refuses to wear a watch and regularly violates the sobriety rule.
 Geoffrey Day, an Ennet House resident who struggles with the clichés of AA. He comes to Ennet House after putting his car through a sporting-goods store window.
  Marlon Bain, a former E.T.A. student who was close to Orin. His obsessive-compulsive disorder has made it nearly impossible for him to leave his apartment. Steeply contacts him for information about Orin and the Incandenzas.

Style
Infinite Jest is a postmodern encyclopedic novel, famous for its length, detail and digressions involving 388 endnotes, some of which themselves have footnotes. It has also been called metamodernist and hysterical realist. Wallace's "encyclopedic display of knowledge" incorporates media theory, linguistics, film studies, sport, addiction, science, and issues of national identity. The book is often humorous yet explores melancholy deeply.

Eschewing chronological plot development and straightforward resolution—a concern often mentioned in reviews—the novel supports a wide range of readings. At various times Wallace said that he intended for the novel's plot to resolve, but indirectly; responding to his editor's concerns about the lack of resolution, he said "the answers all [exist], but just past the last page". Long after publication Wallace maintained this position, stating that the novel "does resolve, but it resolves ... outside of the right frame of the picture. You can get a pretty good idea, I think, of what happens". Critical reviews and a reader's guide have provided insight, but Stephen Burn notes that Wallace privately conceded to Jonathan Franzen that "the story can't fully be made sense of".

In an interview with Charlie Rose, Wallace characterized the novel's heavy use of endnotes as a method of disrupting the linearity of the text while maintaining some sense of narrative cohesion. In a separate interview on Michael Silverblatt's radio show Bookworm, Wallace said the plotting and notes had a fractal structure modeled after the Sierpiński gasket.

Themes

The novel touches on many topics, including addiction (to drugs, but also to sex and fame), withdrawal, recovery, death, family relationships, absent or dead parents, mental health, suicide, sadness, entertainment, film theory, media theory, linguistics, science, Quebec separatism, national identity, and tennis as a metaphysical activity.

Literary connections
Infinite Jest draws explicitly or allusively on many previous works of literature.

As its title implies, the novel is in part based on the play Hamlet. Enfield Tennis Academy corresponds to Denmark, ruled by James (King Hamlet) and Avril (Queen Gertrude). When James dies, he is replaced by Charles (Claudius), the uncle of Avril's gifted son Hal (Prince Hamlet). As in the play, the son's task is to fight incipient mental breakdown in order to redeem his father's reputation.

Another link is to the Odyssey, wherein the son Telemachus (Hal) has to grow apart from his dominating mother Penelope (Avril) and discover the truth about his absent father Odysseus (James). (That pattern is also reproduced in the novel Ulysses, set in a realistic version of Dublin populated by a wide range of inhabitants, just as Infinite Jest is mostly in a realistic Boston with a varied population.) In one scene, Hal, on the phone with Orin, says that clipping his toenails into a wastebasket "now seems like an exercise in telemachry.” Orin then asks whether Hal meant telemetry. Christopher Bartlett has argued that Hal's mistake is a direct reference to Telemachus, who for the first four books of the Odyssey believes that his father is dead.

Links to The Brothers Karamazov have been analyzed by Timothy Jacobs, who sees Orin representing the nihilistic Dmitri, Hal standing for Ivan and Mario the simple and good Alyosha.

The film so entertaining that its viewers lose interest in anything else has been likened to the Monty Python sketch "The Funniest Joke in the World", as well as to "the experience machine", a thought experiment by Robert Nozick.

Critical reception

Infinite Jest was marketed heavily, and Wallace had to adapt to being a public figure. He was interviewed in national magazines and went on a 10-city book tour. Publisher Little, Brown equated the book's heft with its importance in marketing and sent a series of cryptic teaser postcards to 4,000 people, announcing a novel of "infinite pleasure" and "infinite style". Rolling Stone sent reporter David Lipsky to follow Wallace on his "triumphant" book tour—the first time the magazine had sent a reporter to profile a young author in ten years. The interview was never published in the magazine but became Lipsky's New York Times-bestselling book Although of Course You End Up Becoming Yourself (2010), of which the 2015 movie The End of the Tour is an adaptation.

Early reviews contributed to Infinite Jest's hype, many of them describing it as a momentous literary event. In the Review of Contemporary Fiction, Steven Moore called the book "a profound study of the postmodern condition." In 2004, Chad Harbach declared that, in retrospect, Infinite Jest "now looks like the central American novel of the past thirty years, a dense star for lesser work to orbit." In a 2008 retrospective by The New York Times, it was described as "a masterpiece that's also a monster—nearly 1,100 pages of mind-blowing inventiveness and disarming sweetness. Its size and complexity make it forbidding and esoteric."

Time magazine included the novel in its list of the 100 best English-language novels published between 1923 and 2005.

As Wallace's magnum opus, Infinite Jest is at the center of the new discipline of "Wallace Studies", which, according to The Chronicle of Higher Education, "... is on its way to becoming a robust scholarly enterprise."

Not all critics were as laudatory. Some early reviews, such as Michiko Kakutani's in The New York Times, were mixed, recognizing the inventiveness of the writing but criticizing the length and plot. She called the novel "a vast, encyclopedic compendium of whatever seems to have crossed Wallace's mind." In the London Review of Books, Dale Peck wrote of the novel, "... it is, in a word, terrible. Other words I might use include bloated, boring, gratuitous, and—perhaps especially—uncontrolled." Harold Bloom, Sterling Professor of Humanities at Yale University, called it "just awful" and written with "no discernible talent" (in the novel, Bloom's own work is called "turgid"). In a review of Wallace's work up to the year 2000, A. O. Scott wrote of Infinite Jest, "[T]he novel's Pynchonesque elements...feel rather willed and secondhand. They are impressive in the manner of a precocious child's performance at a dinner party, and, in the same way, ultimately irritating: they seem motivated, mostly, by a desire to show off."

Some critics have since qualified their initial stances. In 2008, A. O. Scott called Infinite Jest an "enormous, zeitgeist-gobbling novel that set his generation's benchmark for literary ambition" and Wallace "the best mind of his generation". James Wood has said that he regrets his negative review: "I wish I'd slowed down a bit more with David Foster Wallace." Infinite Jest is one of the recommendations in Kakutani's book Ex Libris: 100 Books to Read and Reread.

Adaptations
Playwright Ken Campbell worked on an adaptation of Infinite Jest for the Millennium. His concept was to have 1,000 performers who each paid $23 to take part in the event, which would last a week. It did not come to fruition. German theatrical company Hebbel am Ufer produced a 24-hour avant-garde open-air theatre adaptation in 2012.

In popular culture 
 The Parks and Recreation episode "Partridge" contains various references to the novel. For example, Ann and Chris take the "Incandenza-Pemulis Parenting Compatibility Quiz", and Ann's fertility counselor, Dr. Van Dyne, works at the C.T. Tavis Medical Center.
 The video for The Decemberists' "Calamity Song" recreates the novel's Eschaton chapter.
 Charlie Kaufman's debut novel Antkind has been compared by some critics to Infinite Jest, in both plotline and thematic elements.
 The music video for MC Lars and Wheatus's "Finite Jest" recounts the plot of Wallace's novel from Hal's perspective, recreating scenes from the book.
 The Infinite Summer project, an online book group with the goal of reading Infinite Jest over a single summer, took place in 2009. It included daily commentary from well-known writers, musicians and media personalities.

Translations
Infinite Jest has been translated:
 
 In 2010, Ulrich Blumenbach received the Leipzig Book Fair Prize and the Kurd Laßwitz Award for the translation.
 
 
 
 
 
 
 Polyarinov, Alexey; Karpov, Sergey (2018). Бесконечная Шутка (in Russian). AST. .
 Valkonen, Tero (2020). Päättymätön riemu (in Finnish). Siltala / Sanavalinta. .
 In 2021, Valkonen was awarded the Mikael Agricola Prize.
Kozak, Jolanta (2022). Niewyczerpany żart (in Polish). Wydawnictwo W.A.B. .

See also

 Although of Course You End Up Becoming Yourself
 The End of the Tour
 Something to Do with Paying Attention
 Infinite Summer
 Hysterical realism
 Postmodern literature

References

Further reading

In-depth studies

 Bartlett, Christopher. "'An Exercise in Telemachry': David Foster Wallace's Infinite Jest and Intergenerational Conversation". Critique: Studies in Contemporary Fiction 57.4 (2006), 374–389.
 Burn, Stephen. David Foster Wallace's Infinite Jest: A Reader's Guide. New York, London: Continuum, 2003 (Continuum Contemporaries) 
 Bresnan, Mark. "The Work of Play in David Foster Wallace's Infinite Jest". Critique: Studies in Contemporary Fiction 50:1 (2008), 51–68.
 Carlisle, Greg.  "Elegant Complexity:  A Study of David Foster Wallace's 'Infinite Jest'". Hollywood: SSMG Press, 2007.
 Cioffi, Frank Louis. "An Anguish Becomes Thing: Narrative as Performance in David Foster Wallace's Infinite Jest". Narrative 8.2 (2000), 161–181.
 Goerlandt, Iannis. "'Put the Book Down and Slowly Walk Away': Irony and David Foster Wallace's Infinite Jest". Critique: Studies in Contemporary Fiction47.3 (2006), 309–328.
 Hering, David. "Infinite Jest: Triangles, Cycles, Choices and Chases". Consider David Foster Wallace: Critical Essays. Ed. David Hering. Austin/Los Angeles: SSMG, 2010.
 Holland, Mary K. "'The Art's Heart's Purpose': Braving the Narcissistic Loop of David Foster Wallace's Infinite Jest". Critique: Studies in Contemporary Fiction 47.3 (2006), 218–242.
 J acobs, Timothy. "The Brothers Incandenza: Translating Ideology in Fyodor Dostoevsky's The Brothers Karamazov and David Foster Wallace's Infinite Jest." Texas Studies in Literature and Language 49.3 (2007): 265–292.
 Jacobs, Timothy. "The Brothers Incandenza: Translating Ideology in Fyodor Dostoevsky's The Brothers Karamazov and David Foster Wallace's Infinite Jest." Contemporary Literary Criticism Vol. 271. Ed. Jeffrey Hunter. New York: Gale, 2009. 313–327.
 Jacobs, Timothy. "American Touchstone: The Idea of Order in Gerard Manley Hopkins and David Foster Wallace." Comparative Literature Studies 38.3 (2001): 215–231.
 Jacobs, Timothy. "David Foster Wallace's Infinite Jest." The Explicator 58.3 (2000): 172–175.
 Jacobs, Timothy. "David Foster Wallace’s The Broom of the System." Ed. Alan Hedblad. Beacham's Encyclopedia of Popular Fiction. Vol 15. New York: Thomson-Gale, 2001. 41–50.
 LeClair, Tom. "The Prodigious Fiction of Richard Powers, William Vollmann, and David Foster Wallace". Critique: Studies in Contemporary Fiction 38.1 (1996), 12–37.
 Nichols, Catherine "Dialogizing Postmodern Carnival: David Foster Wallace's Infinite Jest". Critique: Studies in Contemporary Fiction 43.1 (2001), 3–16.
 Pennacchio, Filippo. "What Fun Life Was. Saggio su Infinite Jest di David Foster Wallace". Milano: Arcipelago Edizioni, 2009.

Interviews
 Lipsky, David, Although of Course You End Up Becoming Yourself: A Road Trip with David Foster Wallace. New York: Broadway, 2010.
 .
 .
 NPR interview about Infinite Jest
 Wallace talking about his novel on Michael Silverblatt's "Bookworm" radio show

External links

 The Infinite Jest Wiki
 "Infinite Jest by David Foster Wallace" by Ted Gioia (The New Canon)
 Infinite Atlas An interactive map of all the characters, places, and events in Infinite Jest
 Interactive visualization of Infinite Jest

1996 American novels
Black comedy books
Novels set in Boston
Little, Brown and Company books
Metafictional novels
Novels by David Foster Wallace
Postmodern novels
American sports novels
Books about film
Novels set in Tucson, Arizona
Novels set in Massachusetts
Novels set in Arizona
Novels about consumerism
Novels based on Hamlet
Tragicomedy novels